Nothing to Declare may refer to:

Border Security: Australia's Front Line, also known as Nothing to Declare, Australian television program that airs on the Seven Network
Nothing to Declare (Paul Bley album), 2003
Nothing to Declare (700 Bliss album), 2022
Nothing to Declare (film), a 2010 French comedy film
Nothing to Declare UK, a British version of Border Security: Australia's Front Line which aired in 2011 by Sky 1